{|
{{Infobox ship image
| Ship image = INS Kalvari (S21) at sea.jpg
| Ship image size = 300px
| Ship caption =  at sea
}}

|}

The 'Kalvari class' is a class of diesel-electric attack submarines based on the  being built for the Indian Navy. The class and submarines take their names from the first submarines inducted in the Indian Navy. The submarines are designed by French naval defence and energy company DCNS and are being manufactured by Mazagon Dock Limited in Mumbai.

Project history
In 1997, Indian Ministry of Defence approved a plan to acquire 24 submarines under Project 75. In 1998, India began negotiating with DCN for four Scorpène submarines with two to be built in Mazagon Dock Limited from knocked-down kits. After the Kargil War in 1999, Cabinet Committee on Security approved a 30-year submarine building plan that called for two parallel production lines, each constructing six submarines. The older Project 75 was brought under the new plan, with the two production lines to be built under Project 75 and Project 75I using transfer of technology from different foreign manufacturers. The negotiations were subsequently expanded to include Armaris, a joint venture of DCN and Thales, for six submarines to be built in Mazagon Dock Limited.

On 6 October 2005, India signed a series of contracts for transfer of technology to construct six submarines in Mazagon Dock Limited with Armaris, supply of equipment and services with the Government of France and supply of SM39 Exocet missiles with MBDA. DCN International was designated as the prime contractor in partnership with Navantia. Armaris was responsible for supply of combat systems and technical advisors for construction of submarines at MDL. The entire programme was valued at €2.4 billion. The deal included a 30% offset clause and the submarines were to be delivered over five years starting from 2012. The Scorpène design won the deal because of the capability to fire Exocet anti-ship missiles and an agreement on the air-independent propulsion. India cancelled plans to incorporate DRDO-developed air-independent propulsion system onto the last two submarines being built due to a delay in its development. A plan to buy three more submarines under the options clause was cancelled in September 2016.

Steel cutting for the first submarine began on 14 December 2006 and hull construction was started on 23 May 2007. As of August 2014, the project was running four years behind schedule. The delay has been attributed to slow finalisation of contracts for procurement of sensors and propulsion system components by Mazagon Dock Limited and DCNS. The first submarine, INS Kalvari (Malayalam: tiger shark), was launched on 28 October 2015 and commenced sea trials on 1 May 2016.

In June 2016, a plan to arm Kalvari-class submarines with 98 Black Shark torpedoes from WASS was cancelled in response to corruption allegations against WASS's sister company, AgustaWestland. The defense minister Manohar Parikkar under the NDA government, said that the torpedoes for the submarine will be procured from other companies. SeaHake torpedoes from Germany's Atlas Elektronik and France's F21 torpedoes may be considered. Indigenous torpedoes Varunastra under development by DRDO may also be used as replacements. The submarines have been configured to fire Surface and Underwater Target (SUT) torpedoes for the time being. Naval Materials Research Laboratory (NMRL) of the DRDO is developing an indigenous air-independent propulsion (AIP) systems which will be installed during the first refit programme from 2023.

 Design and description 
The Kalvari'' class is capable of offensive operations across the entire spectrum of naval warfare including anti-surface warfare, anti-submarine warfare, intelligence gathering, mine laying and area surveillance. It can reach a top speed of  when submerged and a maximum speed of  when surfaced. Each ship is powered by four MTU 12V 396 SE84 diesel engines, has 360 battery cells ( each), for power and has a silent Permanently Magnetised Propulsion Motor. The hull, fin and hydroplanes are designed for minimum underwater resistance and all equipment inside the pressure hull is mounted on shock absorbing cradles for enhanced stealth. Special steel was used in its construction which has high tensile strength, capable of withstanding high yield stress and hydro-static force. The class displaces  when surfaced and  when submerged.

This class is equipped with six  torpedo tubes for a combination of 18 heavyweight wire-guided German-made Surface and Underwater Target (SUT) torpedoes and SM39 Exocet anti-ship missiles or 30 mines in place of both. The class is also fitted with mobile C303/S anti-torpedo decoys for self-defence. The weapon systems and sensors are integrated with Submarine Tactical Integrated Combat System (SUBTICS). It has a sonar system is capable of Low Frequency Analysis and Ranging (LOFAR) enabling long range detection and classification. Each submarine has a complement of 8 officers and 35 sailors.

Ships of the class

Gallery

See also
 Cruise missile submarine
 Future of the Indian Navy
 List of submarines of the Indian Navy

References

Kalvari-class submarines
Submarine classes
Attack submarines
Submarines of the Indian Navy